To Duke with Love is an album by Art Farmer featuring compositions associated with Duke Ellington recorded in 1975 and originally released on the Japanese East Wind label.

Reception

Scott Yanow of AllMusic states, "This tasteful set features Art Farmer at his best".

Track listing
All compositions by Duke Ellington except as indicated.
 "In a Sentimental Mood" – 7:07
 "It Don't Mean a Thing (If It Ain't Got That Swing)" (Ellington, Irving Mills) – 5:40
 "The Star Crossed Lovers" – 7:16
 "The Brown Skin Gal in the Calico Gown" (Ellington, Paul Francis Webster) – 7:31
 "Lush Life" (Billy Strayhorn) – 6:28
 "Love You Madly" – 6:28

Personnel
Art Farmer – flugelhorn
Cedar Walton – piano
Sam Jones – bass
Billy Higgins – drums

References

East Wind Records albums
Art Farmer albums
1976 albums